R&G (Rhythm & Gangsta): The Masterpiece is the seventh studio album by American rapper Snoop Dogg. It was released on November 16, 2004, by Doggystyle Records, making its first on Star Trak Entertainment and Geffen Records. Recording sessions took place from November 2003 to September 2004 in each of several recording studios. The album's production was handled from The Neptunes, The Alchemist, Lil Jon, Hi-Tek, Warryn Campbell, and L.T. Hutton, among others.

The album debuted at number six on the US Billboard 200, selling 225,000 copies in its first week. Upon its release, R&G (Rhythm & Gangsta): The Masterpiece received generally mixed to positive reviews from music critics.

Background
In November 2002, Snoop Dogg released his sixth studio album Paid tha Cost to Be da Boss, which spawned two worldwide singles "From tha Chuuuch to da Palace" and two-time Grammy nominated "Beautiful", both which were produced by The Neptunes. In June 2004, it was announced that Snoop Dogg had signed with Pharrell Williams's and Chad Hugo's record label Star Trak Entertainment to produce and serve as executive producers of his then-upcoming seventh studio album.

Singles
"Drop It Like It's Hot" featuring Pharrell, was released as the album's lead single on September 14, 2004. The song was produced by The Neptunes. The song gained critical attention for its sparse production, essentially just tongue clicks, keyboards, and a drum machine beat, that compares it to much of the early 2000s rap that was very minimalist. It was nominated at the 2005's Grammy Awards for Best Rap Song and Best Rap Performance by a Duo or Group, though it lost both awards to the songs "Jesus Walks" by Kanye West, and "Let's Get It Started" by The Black Eyed Peas, respectively. The song reached number 10 on the UK Singles Chart, and number one on the US Billboards Hot 100, becoming Snoop's first US number one single. The song internationally reached the top-ten in 12 countries.

The album's second single, "Let's Get Blown" featuring Pharrell, was released on December 14, 2004. The song was produced by The Neptunes. It did not repeat the success of "Drop It Like It's Hot", but it filled the gap between the aforementioned song and the club hit "Signs". Keyshia Cole, who had not garnered a reputation at that time and was therefore left uncredited (her contribution to the R&G song "Pass It Pass It" also went uncredited). The song samples and contains interpolations from Slave's "Watching You", which was also interpolated in "Gin and Juice". The single became one of Snoop Dogg's biggest hits in the United Kingdom for peaking at number 13, and charted at number 54 on the US Billboards Hot 100.

The album's third single, "Signs" featuring Justin Timberlake and Charlie Wilson, was released on April 25, 2005. The song was produced by The Neptunes. In May 2005, the single reached at number two on the UK Singles Chart, and number 46 on the US Billboards Hot 100. However, it was more popular in Australia staying at number one on the Australian Singles Chart for two weeks. Internationally, the song reached the top-ten in 11 countries.

The album's fourth and final single, "Ups & Downs" featuring Bee Gees, was released on August 15, 2005. The song was produced by Warryn Campbell. The song interpolates The Bee Gees' 1979 hit "Love You Inside Out". The song charted in several countries, but didn't match the success from his previous singles on the album.

Critical reception

R&G (Rhythm & Gangsta): The Masterpiece received generally positive reviews from music critics. At Metacritic they based on an average score of 63 on the review website which indicates "generally favorable reviews". Uncut rated the album 3 stars out of 5 and wrote that "Snoop still manages some earthy funk, assisted by a gargantuan guest list."

Tom Moon of Rolling Stone wrote that "Truth-in-advertising alert: Even at its most deliriously debauched, R&G isn't quite the worlds-coming-together rap-soul masterpiece the title promises. That said, the top-shelf producers here provide the Dogg with some of the most radio-ready backing of his career: The serpentine down-tempo single "Drop It Like It's Hot," produced by the Neptunes, links Snoop's slyly exuberant delivery to a relentless dance-floor bounce. The same basic formula prevails on "Ups and Downs," which reshnizzles the Bee Gees' "Love You Inside and Out." Trouble comes when the Dogg hits the streets: What should have been a sparky duet with 50 Cent, "Oh No," sours quickly, and a coarse anthem featuring Lil Jon and Trina, "Step Yo Game Up," starts out unimaginatively lewd and descends from there. R&G begs for a little more R and some cleverer G – or, if Snoop really wanted to be bold, no G at all".

Tom Breihan of Pitchfork wrote that "R&G; is Snoop's first album for Star Trak, the label run by fallen-off hip-hop hit makers The Neptunes, a duo who all but ruled international radio with dazzling sci-fi stomp-clap new wave beats, but who've been starving for hits ever since they switched up their style to overcooked Vegas schmaltz—all bloopy bass and shuffling drums and swooshing keyboards and unbelievably obnoxious falsetto crooning. The production duo laced five of this album's songs, but their fingerprints are everywhere else here. R&G; has a unified sound, rare in hip-hop albums, but it's a sound based on tinkly pianos and noodly guitars and windchimes. It sounds something like The Black Eyed Peas if they tried to make a Barry White album, but with more falsetto warbling."

Commercial performance
R&G (Rhythm & Gangsta): The Masterpiece debuted at number six on the US Billboard 200 chart, selling 225,000 copies in its first week. In its second week, the album fell to number nine on the Billboard 200, selling 203,000 copies, for a two-week total of 428,000 units. As of March 2008, the album sales 1,724,000 copies in the United States.

Track listing

Sample credits
"I Love to Give You Light" contains a sample from "I Come That You Might Have Life" performed by Andraé Crouch Singers and "The Greatest Love of All" performed by Eddie Murphy.
"Drop It Like It's Hot" contains a sample from "White Horse" performed by Laid Back.
"Can I Get a Flicc Witchu" contains a sample from "One for the Treble (Fresh)" performed by Davy DMX.
"Ups & Downs" contains a sample from "Love You Inside Out" performed by Bee Gees.
"The Bidness" contains a sample from "Think (About It)" performed by Lyn Collins, "Runnin" performed by Edwin Starr, "Richard Pryor Dialogue" performed by Richard Pryor and "Cinderfella Dana Dane" performed by Dana Dane.
"Let's Get Blown" contains samples from "Watching You" performed by Slave.
"Signs" contains a sample of "Early in the Morning" by The Gap Band.
"No Thang on Me" contains a sample from "No Thing on Me (Cocaine Song)" performed by Curtis Mayfield and "All Around the World" performed by Lisa Stansfield.

Personnel
Credits adapted from AllMusic.

 50 Cent – vocals
 The Alchemist – producer
 Dave Aron – mixing
 Steve Baughman – engineer
 Bee Gees – vocals
 Black Jeruz – producer
 J.A. Black – vocals
 Mike Bozzi – assistant
 Ron Browz – keyboards, producer
 Bruce Buechner – engineer
 Sandra Campbell – project coordinator
 Warryn Campbell – instrumentation, producer, programming
 Mike Chav – engineer, guitar, mixing
 Keyshia Cole – vocals
 Bootsy Collins – vocals
 Sean Cooper – sound design
 Daz Dillinger – vocals
 DJ Pooh – vocals
 Shon Don – engineer, mixing, vocals
 Anthony Donelson – guitar
 John Fryer – mixing
 Brian Gardner—mastering engineer
 Ricky Harris – vocals
 Tasha Hayward – hair stylist

 L.T. Hutton – producer, vocals
 Lil Jon – producer, vocals
 Craig Love – guitar
 Anthony Mandler – art direction, design, photography
 Mister Cartoon – logo illustration
 Nelly – vocals
 Mike Nemirovsky – assistant
 The Neptunes – producer
 Nate Oberman – engineer, mixing
 Quazedelic – background vocals, congos, percussion
 April Roomet – stylist
 Sha Money XL – mixing, producer
 Snoop Dogg – primary artist, rhymes, lead vocals, vocal arrangement
 Soopafly – horn arrangements, producer, vocals
 Phil Tan – mixing
 Justin Timberlake – vocals
 Tone Trezure – vocals
 Trina – vocals
 Patrick Viala – mixing
 Kamasi Washington – horn selection
 Pharrell Williams – vocals
 Charlie Wilson – vocals

Chart positions

Weekly charts

Year-end charts

Certifications

See also
 Boss'n Up

References

Snoop Dogg albums
2004 albums
Albums produced by Mr. Porter
Albums produced by Hi-Tek
Albums produced by J. R. Rotem
Albums produced by Lil Jon
Albums produced by L.T. Hutton
Albums produced by the Neptunes
Albums produced by Ron Browz
Albums produced by the Alchemist (musician)
Albums produced by Soopafly
Albums produced by Warryn Campbell
Geffen Records albums
Doggystyle Records albums
Star Trak Entertainment albums